Chance of a Lifetime is an American television competitive talent show that began on ABC on September 6, 1950, and aired on ABC and DuMont between 1952 and 1956.

Format
Three professional performers, usually singers, dancers or instrumentalists, competed. In the early version of the show, there were four contestants with the winner chosen by votes tallied by attendants in the audience.

In the later version, the winner of the first half, determined by an audience applause meter, then competed against a returning champion in the second half.  After both champion and challenger, in that order, have performed, the audience applause meter determines the champion, who receives $1000 cash, the opportunity to return the following week, and a week's engagement at a popular nightspot.

Broadcast history
John Reed King was the host of the 1950 version of the show, which debuted on ABC on September 20, 1950. Dennis James replaced King in 1952, and that version ended on August 20, 1953. King returned to host the DuMont version, which ran from September 11, 1953, to June 17, 1955. ABC then brought the show back from July 3, 1955, to June 23, 1956. In 1954, comedian Jonathan Winters made his TV debut on the DuMont version of the show. Also in 1954, Diahann Carroll appeared on the show as a contestant four weeks in a row.

Production 
The 1950 version of the program originated at WJZ-TV, with Bendix as the sponsor. Robert G. Jennings was the producer, and Charles Harrell was the director.

Episode status
One episode of the DuMont version is held in the J. Fred MacDonald collection at the Library of Congress. Another episode, from the ABC run, is linked below.

Fifteen episodes are held by the UCLA Film and Television Archive. These include two episodes from 1951, eight from 1953, two from 1954, and three from 1955.

See also
List of programs broadcast by the DuMont Television Network
List of surviving DuMont Television Network broadcasts

References

Bibliography
David Weinstein, The Forgotten Network: DuMont and the Birth of American Television (Philadelphia: Temple University Press, 2004) 
Alex McNeil, Total Television, Fourth edition (New York: Penguin Books, 1980) 
Tim Brooks and Earle Marsh, The Complete Directory to Prime Time Network TV Shows, Third edition (New York: Ballantine Books, 1964)

External links
Chance of a Lifetime at IMDB
DuMont historical website
episode of Chance of a Lifetime

1952 American television series debuts
1956 American television series endings
American Broadcasting Company original programming
Black-and-white American television shows
DuMont Television Network original programming
Talent shows